Lawrence Hartshorne (1786 – September 28, 1865) was a hardware merchant and political figure in Nova Scotia. He represented Halifax County in the Nova Scotia House of Assembly from 1825 to 1830.

He was the son of Lawrence Hartshorne and Elizabeth Ustick. In 1815, he married Mary Tremain. Hartshorne served as treasurer for Halifax town and county from 1838 to 1865. He died in Dartmouth.

References 
 A Directory of the Members of the Legislative Assembly of Nova Scotia, 1758-1958, Public Archives of Nova Scotia (1958)

1786 births
1865 deaths
Hardware merchants
Nova Scotia pre-Confederation MLAs
19th-century Canadian businesspeople